Inklin is a locality situated at the confluence of the Inklin and Nakina Rivers in far northwestern British Columbia, Canada, which is the commencement of the Taku River.

References

Unincorporated settlements in British Columbia
Atlin District